The Paris Peace Accords,, officially the Agreement on Ending the War and Restoring Peace in Viet Nam (Hiệp định về chấm dứt chiến tranh, lập lại hòa bình ở Việt Nam), was a peace treaty signed on January 27, 1973, to establish peace in Vietnam and end the Vietnam War. The treaty included the governments of the Democratic Republic of Vietnam (North Vietnam); the Republic of Vietnam (South Vietnam); the United States; and the Provisional Revolutionary Government of the Republic of South Vietnam (PRG), which represented South Vietnamese communists. US ground forces had been sidelined with deteriorating morale and gradually withdrawn to coastal regions and not take part in offensive operations or much direct combat for the preceding two years. The Paris Agreement Treaty would in effect remove all remaining US forces, including air and naval forces in exchange. Direct U.S. military intervention was ended, and fighting between the three remaining powers temporarily stopped for less than a day. The agreement was not ratified by the U.S. Senate.

The negotiations that led to the accord began in 1968, after various lengthy delays. As a result of the accord, the International Control Commission (ICC) was replaced by the International Commission of Control and Supervision (ICCS), which consisted of Canada, Poland, Hungary, and Indonesia, to monitor the agreement. The main negotiators of the agreement were U.S. National Security Advisor Henry Kissinger and the North Vietnamese Politburo member Lê Đức Thọ. Both men were awarded the 1973 Nobel Peace Prize for their efforts, but Lê Đức Thọ refused to accept it.

The agreement's provisions were immediately and frequently broken by both North and South Vietnamese forces with no official response from the United States. Open fighting broke out in March 1973, and North Vietnamese offenses enlarged their control by the end of the year. Two years later, a massive North Vietnamese offensive conquered South Vietnam on April 30, 1975, and the two countries, which had been separated since 1954, united once more on July 2, 1976, as the Socialist Republic of Vietnam.

Part of the negotiations took place in the former residence of the French painter Fernand Léger; it was bequeathed to the French Communist Party.  Ironically, the street of the house was named after Philippe Leclerc de Hauteclocque, who had commanded French forces in Vietnam after the Second World War.

Provisions of the accords

The agreement called for:
The withdrawal of all U.S. and allied forces within sixty days.
The return of prisoners of war parallel to the above.
The clearing of mines from North Vietnamese ports by the U.S.
A cease-fire in place in South Vietnam followed by precise delineations of communist and government zones of control.
The establishment of a “National Council of National Reconciliation and Concord” composed of a communist, government, and neutralist side to ensure democratic liberties and organize free elections in South Vietnam.
The reunification of Vietnam through peaceful means without coercion or annexation by either party, and without foreign interference.
The establishment of “Joint Military Commissions” composed of the four parties and an “International Commission of Control and Supervision” composed of Canada, Hungary, Indonesia, and Poland to implement the cease-fire. Both operate by unanimity.
The withdrawal of foreign troops from Laos and Cambodia. 
A ban on the introduction of war material in South Vietnam unless on a replacement basis.
A ban on introducing further military personnel into South Vietnam.
U.S. financial contributions to “healing the wounds of war” throughout Indochina.

Paris peace negotiations

Early deadlocks

Following the strong showing of anti-war candidate Eugene McCarthy in the New Hampshire primary, in March 1968 U.S President Lyndon B. Johnson halted bombing operations over the northern portion of North Vietnam (Operation Rolling Thunder), in order to encourage Hanoi (the perceived locus of the insurgency) to begin negotiations. Although some sources state that the bombing halt decision announced on March 31, 1968, was related to events occurring within the White House and the Presidents counsel of Secretary of Defense Clark Clifford and others rather than the events in New Hampshire. Shortly thereafter, Hanoi agreed to discuss a complete halt of the bombing, and a date was set for representatives of both parties to meet in Paris. The sides first met on May 10, with the delegations headed by Xuân Thuỷ, who would remain the official leader of the North Vietnamese delegation throughout the process, and U.S. ambassador-at-large W. Averell Harriman.

For five months, the negotiations stalled as North Vietnam demanded that all bombing of North Vietnam be stopped, while the U.S. side demanded that North Vietnam agree to a reciprocal de-escalation in South Vietnam; it was not until October 31 that Johnson agreed to end the air strikes and serious negotiations could begin.

One of the largest hurdles to effective negotiation was the fact that North Vietnam and the National Front for the Liberation of South Vietnam (NLF, or Viet Cong) in the South, refused to recognize the government of South Vietnam; with equal persistence, the government in Saigon refused to acknowledge the legitimacy of the NLF. Harriman resolved this dispute by developing a system by which North Vietnam and U.S. would be the named parties; NLF officials could join the North Vietnam team without being recognized by South Vietnam, while Saigon's representatives joined their U.S. allies.

A similar debate concerned the shape of the table to be used at the conference. The North favored a circular table, in which all parties, including NLF representatives, would appear to be "equal"' in importance. The South Vietnamese argued that only a rectangular table was acceptable, for only a rectangle could show two distinct sides to the conflict. Eventually a compromise was reached, in which representatives of the northern and southern governments would sit at a circular table, with members representing all other parties sitting at individual square tables around them.

Negotiations and the Nixon campaign
Bryce Harlow, a former White House staff member in the Eisenhower administration, claimed to have "a double agent working in the White House....I kept Nixon informed." Harlow and Henry Kissinger (who was friendly with both campaigns and guaranteed a job in either a Humphrey or Nixon administration in the upcoming election) separately predicted Johnson's "bombing halt". Democratic senator George Smathers informed President Johnson that "the word is out that we are making an effort to throw the election to Humphrey. Nixon has been told of it".

According to presidential historian Robert Dallek, Kissinger's advice "rested not on special knowledge of decision making at the White House but on an astute analyst's insight into what was happening." CIA intelligence analyst William Bundy stated that Kissinger obtained "no useful inside information" from his trip to Paris, and "almost any experienced Hanoi watcher might have come to the same conclusion". While Kissinger may have "hinted that his advice was based on contacts with the Paris delegation," this sort of "self-promotion...is at worst a minor and not uncommon practice, quite different from getting and reporting real secrets."

Nixon asked prominent Chinese-American politician Anna Chennault to be his "channel to Mr. Thieu"; Chennault agreed and periodically reported to John Mitchell that Thieu had no intention of attending a peace conference. On November 2, Chennault informed the South Vietnamese ambassador: "I have just heard from my boss in Albuquerque who says his boss [Nixon] is going to win. And you tell your boss [Thieu] to hold on a while longer." Johnson found out through the NSA and was enraged saying that Nixon had "blood on his hands" and that Senate Minority Leader Everett Dirksen agreed with Johnson that such action was "treason." Defense Secretary Clark Clifford considered the moves an illegal violation of the Logan Act.

In response, President Johnson ordered the wire-tapping of members of the Nixon campaign. Dallek wrote that Nixon's efforts "probably made no difference" because Thieu was unwilling to attend the talks and there was little chance of an agreement being reached before the election; however, his use of information provided by Harlow and Kissinger was morally questionable, and vice president Hubert Humphrey's decision not to make Nixon's actions public was "an uncommon act of political decency."

Nixon government
After winning the 1968 presidential election, Richard Nixon became president of the U.S. in January 1969. He then replaced U.S. ambassador Harriman with Henry Cabot Lodge Jr., who was later replaced by David Bruce. Also that year, the NLF set up a Provisional Revolutionary Government (PRG) to gain government status at the talks. However, the primary negotiations that led to the agreement did not occur at the Peace Conference at all but were carried out during secret negotiations between Kissinger and Lê Đức Thọ, which began on August 4, 1969.

North Vietnam insisted for three years that the agreement could not be concluded unless the United States agreed to remove South Vietnamese President Nguyễn Văn Thiệu from power and replace him with someone more acceptable to Hanoi. Nixon and Kissinger were unwilling to sign an agreement to overthrow a government the NLF had failed to overthrow by force of arms, though the extent of North Vietnamese demands is contested. Historian Marilyn B. Young, contends that the contents of Hanoi's proposal were systematically distorted from their original plea to permit Thiệu's replacement, to what Kissinger propagated as a demand for his overthrow.

Breakthrough and agreement
On May 8, 1972, President Nixon made a major concession to North Vietnam by announcing that the U.S. would accept a cease-fire in place as a precondition for its military withdrawal. In other words, the U.S. would withdraw its forces from South Vietnam without North Vietnam doing the same. The concession broke a deadlock and resulted in progress in the talks over the next few months.

The final major breakthrough came on October 8, 1972. Prior to this, North Vietnam had been disappointed by the results of its Nguyen Hue Offensive (known in the West as the Easter Offensive), which had resulted in the United States countering with "Operation Linebacker," a significant air bombing campaign that blunted the North's drive in the South as well as inflicting damage in the North. Also, they feared increased isolation if Nixon's efforts at détente significantly improved U.S. relations with the chief communist powers, the Soviet Union and the People's Republic of China, who were backing the North Vietnamese military effort. In a meeting with Kissinger, Thọ significantly modified his bargaining line, allowing that the Saigon government could remain in power and that negotiations between the two South Vietnamese parties could develop a final settlement. Within 10 days the secret talks drew up a final draft. Kissinger held a press conference in Washington during which he announced that "peace is at hand."

When Thiệu, who had not even been informed of the secret negotiations, was presented with the draft of the new agreement, he was furious with Kissinger and Nixon (who were perfectly aware of South Vietnam's negotiating position) and refused to accept it without significant changes. He then made several public radio addresses, claiming that the proposed agreement was worse than it actually was. Hanoi was flabbergasted, believing that it had been duped into a propaganda ploy by Kissinger. On October 26, Radio Hanoi broadcast key details of the draft agreement.

However, as U.S. casualties had mounted throughout the conflict since 1965, American domestic support for the war had deteriorated, and by the fall of 1972 there was major pressure on the Nixon administration to withdraw from the war. Consequently, the U.S. brought great diplomatic pressure upon their South Vietnamese ally to sign the peace treaty even if the concessions Thiệu wanted could not be achieved. Nixon pledged to provide continued substantial aid to South Vietnam, and given his recent landslide victory in the presidential election, it seemed possible that he would be able to follow through on that pledge. To demonstrate his seriousness to Thiệu, Nixon ordered the heavy Operation Linebacker II bombings of North Vietnam in December 1972. Nixon also attempted to bolster South Vietnam's military forces by ordering that large quantities of U.S. military material and equipment be given to South Vietnam from May to December 1972 under Operations Enhance and Enhance Plus. These operations were also designed to keep North Vietnam at the negotiating table and to prevent them from abandoning negotiations and seeking total victory. When the North Vietnamese government agreed to resume "technical" discussions with the United States, Nixon ordered a halt to bombings north of the 20th parallel on December 30. With the U.S. committed to disengagement (and after threats from Nixon that South Vietnam would be abandoned if he did not agree), Thiệu had little choice but to accede.

On January 15, 1973, President Nixon announced a suspension of offensive actions against North Vietnam. Kissinger and Thọ met again on January 23 and signed off on a treaty that was basically identical to the draft of three months earlier. The agreement was signed by the leaders of the official delegations on January 27, 1973, at the Hotel Majestic in Paris.

Aftermath

The Paris Peace Accords effectively removed the U.S. from the conflict in Vietnam. Prisoners from both sides were exchanged, with American ones primarily released during Operation Homecoming. Around 31,961 North Vietnamese/VC prisoners (26,880 military, 5081 civilians) were released in return for 5942 South Vietnamese prisoners. However, the agreement's provisions were routinely flouted by both the North Vietnamese and the South Vietnamese government, eliciting no response from the United States, and ultimately resulting in the communists enlarging the area under their control by the end of 1973. North Vietnamese military forces gradually built up their military infrastructure in the areas they controlled and two years later were in a position to launch the successful offensive that ended South Vietnam's status as an independent country. Fighting began almost immediately after the agreement was signed, due to a series of mutual retaliations, and by March 1973, full-fledged war had resumed.

Nixon had secretly promised Thiệu that he would use airpower to support the South Vietnamese government should it be necessary. During his confirmation hearings in June 1973, Secretary of Defense James Schlesinger was sharply criticized by some senators after he stated that he would recommend resumption of U.S. bombing in North Vietnam if North Vietnam launched a major offensive against South Vietnam, but by August 15, 1973, 95% of American troops and their allies had left Vietnam (both North and South) as well as Cambodia and Laos under the Case-Church Amendment. The amendment, which was approved by the U.S. Congress in June 1973, prohibited further U.S. military activity in Vietnam, Laos and Cambodia unless the president secured Congressional approval in advance. However, during this time, Nixon was being driven from office due to the Watergate scandal, which led to his resignation in 1974. When the North Vietnamese began their final offensive early in 1975, the U.S. Congress refused to appropriate increased military assistance for South Vietnam, citing strong opposition to the war by Americans and the loss of American equipment to the North by retreating Southern forces. Thiệu subsequently resigned, accusing the U.S. of betrayal in a TV and radio address:

Saigon fell to the North Vietnamese army supported by Viet Cong units on April 30, 1975. Schlesinger had announced early in the morning of April 29 the beginning of Operation Frequent Wind, which entailed the evacuation of the last U.S. diplomatic, military and civilian personnel from Saigon via helicopter, which was completed in the early morning hours of April 30. Not only did North Vietnam conquer South Vietnam, but the communists were also victorious in Cambodia when the Khmer Rouge captured Phnom Penh on April 17, as were the Pathet Lao in Laos successful in capturing Vientiane on December 2. Like Saigon, U.S. civilian and military personnel were evacuated from Phnom Penh, U.S. diplomatic presence in Vientiane was significantly downgraded, and the number of remaining U.S. personnel was severely reduced.

Assessment
According to Finnish historian Jussi Hanhimäki, due to triangular diplomacy which isolated it, South Vietnam was "pressurized into accepting an agreement that virtually ensured its collapse". During negotiations, Kissinger stated that the United States would not intervene militarily 18 months after an agreement, but that it might intervene before that. In Vietnam War historiography, this has been termed the "decent interval".

Signatories
  Nguyen Duy Trinh, Minister for Foreign Affairs for The Democratic Republic of Vietnam
  Nguyễn Thị Bình, Minister for Foreign Affairs for The Provisional Revolutionary Government of the Republic of South Vietnam
  William P. Rogers, United States Secretary of State
  Trần Văn Lắm, Minister for Foreign Affairs for the Republic of Vietnam

Other key figures in the negotiations
  Henry Cabot Lodge Jr., former United States Ambassador to South Vietnam, head of the U.S. delegation
  Henry Kissinger, special advisor of the President of the United States of America
  William J. Porter
  Xuân Thủy, head of delegation of the Democratic Republic of Vietnam 
  Lê Đức Thọ, special advisor of the government of Democratic Republic of Vietnam
 Thích Nhất Hạnh, a Buddhist monk and peace activist living in exile in France

References

 “Les Accords de Paris, quarante ans plus tard, un film de Rina Sherman” documentary by Rina Sherman (HD, 71 min).

Further reading
 Herrington, Stuart A. (1983). "Peace with Honor? An American Reports on Vietnam" Presidio Press. Part II, "Life Under The Paris Agreement" pp. 16–40.
 Herschensohn, Bruce (2010). An American Amnesia: How the U.S. Congress Forced the Surrenders of South Vietnam and Cambodia. New York: Beaufort Books. .

External links

 Nixon and Vietnam Timeline
 Timeline of NVA invasion of South Vietnam
 “LBJ Tapes Implicate Nixon With Treason”. ABC News. December 5, 2008, (video).
 
 “Les Accords de Paris, quarante ans plus tard, un film de Rina Sherman” documentary by Rina Sherman (HD, 71 min).

1973 in international relations
1973 in military history
1973 in Paris
1973 in Vietnam
Cold War treaties
Henry Kissinger
January 1973 events in Europe
Peace treaties of the United States
Peace treaties of Vietnam
Treaties concluded in 1973
Treaties establishing intergovernmental organizations
Treaties of North Vietnam
Treaties of South Vietnam
Vietnam War
Articles containing video clips